Sussex County Cricket Club is the oldest of eighteen first-class county clubs within the domestic cricket structure of England and Wales. It represents the historic county of Sussex. Its limited overs team is called the Sussex Sharks. The club was founded in 1839 as a successor to the various Sussex county cricket teams, including the old Brighton Cricket Club, which had been representative of the county of Sussex as a whole since the 1720s. The club has always held first-class status. Sussex have competed in the County Championship since the official start of the competition in 1890 and have played in every top-level domestic cricket competition in England.

The club colours are traditionally blue and white and the shirt sponsors are Galloways Accounting for the LV County Championship and Dafabet for Royal London One-Day Cup matches and Vitality Blast T20 matches. Its home ground is the County Cricket Ground, Hove. Sussex also play matches around the county at Arundel, Eastbourne and Horsham.

Sussex won its first official County Championship title in 2003 and subsequently became the dominant team of the decade, repeating the success in 2006 and 2007. In 2006 Sussex achieved ‘the double’, beating Lancashire to clinch the C&G Trophy, before winning the County Championship following an emphatic victory against Nottinghamshire at Trent Bridge, in which Sussex defeated their hosts by an innings and 245 runs. Sussex then won the title for the third time in five years in 2007, when in a nail-biting finale on the last day of the season, Sussex defeated Worcestershire early in the day and then had to wait until past five o'clock as title rivals Lancashire narrowly failed to beat Surrey – prompting relieved celebrations at the County Cricket Ground, Hove. Sussex enjoyed further limited overs success with consecutive Pro40 wins in 2008 and 2009 as well as beating Somerset at Edgbaston to lift the 2009 Twenty20 Cup. The south coast county ended the decade having won ten trophies in ten years.

On 1 November 2015, Sussex County Cricket Club (SCCC) merged with the Sussex Cricket Board (SCB) to form a single governing body for cricket in Sussex, called Sussex Cricket Limited (SCL).

Honours

First XI honours
 County Championship (3) – 2003, 2006, 2007 
Division Two (2) – 2001, 2010 
 Friends Provident Trophy (5) – 1963, 1964, 1978, 1986, 2006 
 Pro40 National League (3) – 1982, 2008, 2009 
Division Two (2) – 1999, 2005
 Twenty20 Cup (1) – 2009

Second XI honours
 Second XI Championship (3) – 1978, 1990, 2007
 Second XI Trophy (1) – 2005

Notes

Earliest cricket

Sussex, along with Kent, is believed to be the birthplace of cricket. It is believed that cricket was invented by children living on the Weald in Anglo-Saxon or Norman times.

The first definite mention of cricket in Sussex relates to ecclesiastical court records in 1611 which state that two parishioners of Sidlesham in West Sussex failed to attend church on Easter Sunday because they were playing cricket. They were fined 12d each and made to do penance.

Cricket became established in Sussex during the 17th century and the earliest village matches took place before the English Civil War. It is believed that the earliest county teams were formed in the aftermath of the Restoration in 1660. In 1697, the earliest "great match" recorded was for 50 guineas apiece between two elevens at a venue in Sussex.

Matches involving the two great Sussex patrons Charles Lennox, 2nd Duke of Richmond and Sir William Gage, 7th Baronet were first recorded in 1725. The earliest known use of Sussex in a match title occurred in 1729. From 1741, Richmond patronised the famous Slindon Cricket Club, whose team was representative of the county.

After the death of Richmond in 1751, Sussex cricket declined until the emergence of the Brighton club at its Prince of Wales Ground in 1790. This club sustained cricket in Sussex through the Napoleonic Wars and, as a result, the county team was very strong in the 1820s when it included the great bowlers Jem Broadbridge and William Lillywhite.

Origin of club

On 17 June 1836, the Sussex Cricket Fund was set up to support county matches, after a meeting in Brighton. This led directly to the formation on 1 March 1839 of Sussex County Cricket Club, England's oldest county club. Sussex CCC played its initial first-class match versus Marylebone Cricket Club (MCC) at Lord's on 10 & 11 June 1839.

Sussex crest
The Sussex crest depicts a mythological, footless bird called the Martlet, and is similar to Coat of arms of Sussex. Capped players have six martlets on their sweaters, and the crest with gold trimming on their caps; uncapped players instead have only the club crest on their left breast, and white trimming on their caps.

Sussex grounds

In total, Sussex CCC have played at 17 grounds, four of which have been in Brighton and Hove. The first County match was played at Eaton Road on 6 June 1872 against Gloucestershire.
Currently, the main venue for the club's First and Second XI is The County Ground in Hove, although matches are also played regularly at the grounds at Arundel and Horsham. Other grounds for  first class matches have included Sheffield Park, Chichester, Worthing, Eastbourne and Hastings.

Current squad
 No. denotes the player's squad number, as worn on the back of their shirt.
  denotes players with international caps.
  denotes a player who has been awarded a county cap.

Coaching staff
 Director of Cricket:  Keith Greenfield
 Head Coach:   Paul Farbrace  
 Academy Director: Vacant 
 Batting Coach:  Grant Flower
 Bowling Coach:  James Kirtley
 Fielding/Wicket-keeping Coach:  Sarah Taylor

Notable Sussex players

This list includes those Sussex players who have played in Test cricket since 1877, One Day International cricket since 1971, or have made an outstanding contribution (e.g.: scoring most runs or taking most wickets in a season).

Afghanistan 

 Rashid Khan

Australia 

 Michael Bevan
 Alex Carey
 Michael Di Venuto
 Tony Dodemaide
 Ryan Harris
 Travis Head
 Steve Magoffin
 Josh Philippe
 Jason Voros

Bangladesh 

 Mustafizur Rahman

Bermuda 

 Delray Rawlins

England 

 Chris Adams
 Tim Ambrose
 Jofra Archer
 Ravi Bopara
 Ted Bowley
 Danny Briggs
 Jem Broadbridge
 Harry Butt
 Henry Charlwood
 George Cox senior
 Mason Crane
 Jemmy Dean
 Ted Dexter
 Kumar Shri Duleepsinhji
 Steven Finn
 C. B. Fry
 George Garton
 Ed Giddins
 Tony Greig
 Chris Jordan
 James Kirtley
 James Langridge
 John Langridge
 Jason Lewry
 William Lillywhite
 Robin Martin-Jenkins
 Stuart Meaker
 Tymal Mills
 Richard Montgomerie
 Peter Moores
 Alan Oakman
 Monty Panesar
 Paul Parker
 Jim Parks, Jr.
 Jim Parks, Sr.
 Tony Pigott
 Matt Prior
 K S Ranjitsinhji
 Rajesh Rao
 Dermot Reeve
 Albert Relf
 Ollie Robinson
 Ian Salisbury
 Phil Salt
 Ajmal Shahzad
 David Sheppard
 John Snow
 Martin Speight
 Ken Suttle
 Maurice Tate
 Ian Thomson
 Joe Vine
 Alan Wells
 Colin Wells
 John Wisden
 Luke Wright
 Michael Yardy

England  / Sri Lanka 

 Gehan Mendis

Greece 

 Aristides Karvelas

India 

 Mansoor Ali Khan Pataudi
 Piyush Chawla
 Cheteshwar Pujara
 Ishant Sharma

Ireland 

 George Dockrell
 Ed Joyce

Italy

 Grant Stewart

Namibia 

 David Wiese

Netherlands 

 Michael Rippon
 Bas Zuiderent

New Zealand 

 Tom Bruce
 Brendon McCullum
 Tim Seifert
 Scott Styris
 Ross Taylor
 Lou Vincent

Pakistan 

 Mushtaq Ahmed
 Mohammad Akram
 Yasir Arafat
 Naved Arif
 Faheem Ashraf
 Umar Gul
 Mir Hamza
 Imran Khan
 Javed Miandad
 Saqlain Mushtaq
 Rana Naved-ul-Hasan
 Mohammad Rizwan
 Mohammed Sami
 Ashar Zaidi

Scotland 

 Matt Machan
 Calum MacLeod
 Stuart Whittingham

South Africa 

 Peter Kirsten
 Garth Le Roux
 Wayne Parnell
 Vernon Philander
 Johannes van der Wath
 Kirk Wernars
 Kepler Wessels
 Stiaan van Zyl

Sri Lanka 

 Mahela Jayawardene
 Nuwan Kulasekara

West Indies 

 Corey Collymore
 Vasbert Drakes
 Obed McCoy
 Dwayne Smith
 Franklyn Stephenson
 Jerome Taylor

Zimbabwe 
 Murray Goodwin

Records

Most first-class runs for Sussex 
Qualification – 20,000 runs

Most first-class wickets for Sussex 
Qualification – 1,000 wickets

Team
 Highest total for – 742/5d v. Somerset, Taunton, 2009 
 Highest total against – 726 by Nottinghamshire, Nottingham, 1895
 Lowest total for – 19 v. Surrey, Godalming, 1830, v. Nottinghamshire, Hove, 1873 
 Lowest total against – 18 by Kent, Gravesend, 1867

Batting
 Highest score – 344* Murray Goodwin v. Somerset, Taunton, 2009
 Most runs in season – 2,850 J. G. Langridge, 1949

Highest partnership for each wicket
 1st – 490 Ted Bowley and John Langridge v. Middlesex, Hove, 1933
 2nd – 385 Ted Bowley and Maurice Tate v. Northamptonshire, Hove, 1921
 3rd – 385* Michael Yardy and Murray Goodwin v. Warwickshire, Hove, 2006
 4th – 363 Murray Goodwin and Carl Hopkinson v. Somerset, Taunton, 2009
 5th – 297 Jim Parks and Harry Parks v. Hampshire, Portsmouth, 1937
 6th – 335 Luke Wright and Ben Brown v. Durham, Hove, 2014
 7th – 344 Ranjitsinhji and Billy Newham v. Essex, Leyton, 1902
 8th – 291 Robin Martin-Jenkins and Mark Davis v. Somerset, Taunton, 2002
 9th – 178 Harry Parks and Albert Wensley v. Derbyshire, Horsham, 1930
 10th – 164 Ollie Robinson and Matt Hobden v. Durham, Chester-le-Street, 2015

Source:

Bowling
 Best bowling – 10–48 C. H. G Bland v. Kent, Tonbridge, 1899
 Best match bowling – 17–106 G. R. Cox v. Warwickshire, Horsham, 1926
 Wickets in season – 198 M. W. Tate, 1925

See also 
 Cricket in Sussex
 Sport in Sussex

Explanatory notes

Citations

Further reading
 Timothy J McCann, Sussex Cricket in the Eighteenth Century, Sussex Record Society, 2004
 Playfair Cricket Annual: various issues
 Wisden Cricketers' Almanack (annual): various issues

External links
 Official site

 
1839 establishments in England
Cricket in East Sussex
Cricket in West Sussex
English first-class cricket teams
History of Sussex
Sport in Brighton and Hove
Cricket clubs established in 1839